Justyna is a Polish feminine given name, a variation of Justina or Justine. It may refer to
Gusta Dawidson Draenger (1917–1943), Polish Jewish resistance fighter  
Justyna Banasiak (born 1986), Polish group rhythmic gymnast
Justyna Bojczuk (born 1995), Polish actress
Justyna Jegiołka (born 1991), Polish tennis player
Justyna Kaczkowska (born 1997), Polish professional racing cyclist
Justyna Kasprzycka (born 1987), Polish high jumper
Justyna Karpala (born 1992), Polish judoka
Justyna Kozdryk (born 1980), Polish powerlifter
Justyna Kowalczyk (born 1983), Polish cross country skier
Justyna Łukasik (born 1993), Polish volleyball player
Justyna Majkowska (born 1977), Polish singer
Justyna Mospinek (born 1983), Polish archer
Justyna Plutowska (born 1991), Polish ice dancer
Justyna Smosarska (born 1986), Polish weightlifter
Justyna Steczkowska (born 1972), Polish singer, songwriter, photographer, and actress
Justyna Święty (born 1992), Polish sprint runner
Justyna Monde (born 1993), European model and digital talent

Polish feminine given names